Germany (German: Deutschland) is a country in Central Europe, that stretches from the Alps, across the North European Plain to the North Sea and the Baltic Sea. It is the second-most populous country in Europe after Russia, and is seventh-largest country by area in the continent.

Elevation ranges from the mountains of the Alps (highest point: the Zugspitze at ) in the south to the shores of the North Sea (Nordsee) in the northwest and the Baltic Sea (Ostsee) in the northeast.

Germany has the second-most borders of any European country, after Russia. It shares borders with nine countries: Denmark in the north, Poland and the Czech Republic in the east, Switzerland (its only non-EU neighbor) and Austria in the south, France in the southwest and Belgium, Luxembourg and the Netherlands in the west. Germany also shares a maritime border with Sweden in the north and the United Kingdom in the northwest.

Area
Germany is in Central Europe, bordering Denmark in the north, Poland and the Czech Republic in the east, Austria and Switzerland in the south, France and Luxembourg in the south-west, and Belgium and the Netherlands in the north-west. It is the seventh largest country by area in Europe and the 63rd largest in the world.

Extreme points

 Northernmost point: List, Sylt, Schleswig-Holstein 
 Northernmost point in mainland Germany: Rodenäs, Schleswig-Holstein 
 Southernmost point: Haldenwanger Eck, Oberstdorf, Bavaria 
 Westernmost point: Isenbruch, Selfkant, North Rhine-Westphalia 
 Easternmost point: Deschka, Neißeaue, Saxony 
Highest point: Zugspitze, in the Bavarian Alps, Garmisch-Partenkirchen / Grainau, Bavaria 
Highest settlement: Feldberg, Baden-Württemberg, in the Black Forest,

Maritime claims
 Continental shelf:  depth or to the depth of exploitation.
The exact EEZ is due to conventions with neighbouring states.
 Territorial sea:

Physical geography

The northern third of the country lies in the North European Plain, with flat terrain crossed by northward-flowing watercourses (Elbe, Ems, Weser, Oder). Wetlands and marshy conditions are found close to the Dutch border and along the Frisian coast. Sandy Mecklenburg in the northeast has many glacier-formed lakes dating to the last glacial period.

Moving south, central Germany features rough and somewhat patternless hilly and mountainous countryside, some of it formed by ancient volcanic activity. The Rhine valley cuts through the western part of this region. The central uplands continue east and north as far as the Saale and merge with the Ore Mountains on the border with the Czech Republic. Upland regions include the Eifel, Hunsrück and Palatine Forest west of the Rhine, the Taunus hills north of Frankfurt, the Vogelsberg massif, the Rhön, and the Thüringer Wald. South of Berlin, the east-central part of the country is more like the low northern areas, with sandy soil and river wetlands such as the Spreewald region.

Southern Germany's landforms are defined by various linear hill and mountain ranges like the two adjacent ranges of the Swabian and Franconian Alb (reaching approximately from the source of the Danube in the southwest of Baden-Württemberg, south of Stuttgart, across Swabia into Central Franconia and to the valley of the river Main) and the Bavarian Forest along the border between Bavaria and the Czech Republic. The Alps on the southern border are the highest mountains, but relatively little Alpine terrain lies within Germany (in southeastern Swabia and Upper Bavaria) compared to Switzerland and Austria. The Black Forest, on the southwestern border with France, separates the Rhine from the headwaters of the Danube on its eastern slopes.

Climate

The north–south difference in Germany, between 55°03"N (at List on Sylt) and 47°16"N (around Oberstdorf, Bavaria) equals almost eight degrees of latitude (or 889 km), which can be seen especially during the warm season in the differences between the average temperatures. Besides that, there is a strong west–east cline in temperature. This is explained by the North western Germany’s flat and open landscapes and its closeness to the sea, and South's higher terrain, larger distance from the sea, and the Alps. These mountains prevent much of the usually warmer Mediterranean air blowing into southern Germany. To the north of the Alps and the Carpathians, the local climate becomes colder, even at the same latitude and altitude. This is caused by some areas being further away from the Atlantic Ocean's Gulf Stream, known for having a warm current for its latitude, in addition to being closer to Russia's and Siberia's extremely cold winter winds. Even if Siberian winter winds are not dominating, when they do hit Germany, temperatures can in extreme cases fall to -20 C in the mountains and below during the nights, and this has an effect on the average temperatures of November to March. Although rare, when such cold air reaches Germany, the North-Eastern parts become mainly affected, while the Southwest receives few cold days in general. The Gulf Stream results in the coast having the mildest nights in the winter, almost never freezing. 

The warmest area in Germany is the area bordering France, west of the Schwarzwald hills, roughly between Mannheim to the north and the Swiss border to the south. The coldest area (except for mountain peaks) is found in the southeastern parts of eastern Germany around Dresden and Görlitz up to Berlin.

Germany's climate is temperate and marine in the West, humid continental to the East and humid subtropical in the Southwest. It features mild winters in the Southwest, cold winters in the East and is mostly overcast from November to February. Summers are mild to warm in the north and hot in the south. The North and Middle of Germany lies fully in the temperate climatic zone in which humid westerly winds predominate. In the northwest and the north, the climate is oceanic. Winters there are relatively mild and summers comparatively cool. In the east, the climate shows clear continental features; winters can be very cold for long periods, and summers can become very warm. Dry periods are often recorded.

In the center and the south, there is a transitional climate which may be predominantly oceanic or continental, according to the general weather situation. Winters are cool and summers warm, though maximum temperatures can exceed  for several days in a row during heat waves. 

The warmest regions of Germany can be found in the southwest (see rhine rift, German Wine Route and Palatinate). Sometimes, minimum temperatures do not drop below , which is relatively rare in other regions, except the North Sea Coast and Western City climates.

Examples

Land use of Germany

The majority of Germany is covered by either arable land (33.95%); permanent crops cover 0.57% of the land.
 
The German-Austrian border crosses itself near Jungholz. The border with Belgium includes 5 German exclaves because the Vennbahn railway is on Belgian territory crossing in and out of Germany.

Rivers

The main rivers in Germany are:
 The Rhine (Rhein in German) with a German section extending  (main tributaries including the Neckar, the Main and the Moselle (Mosel));

Further important rivers include the Saale and the Main in central Germany, the Neckar in the southwest, the Weser in the North and the Oder at the eastern border.

Caves

Throughout the Karst rocks many caves were formed especially in the valley of the Hönne. The biggest culture cave of Europe is located in Balve.

Tidal Flats
A recent global remote sensing analysis suggested that there were 2,783 km2 of tidal flats in Germany, making it the 11th ranked country in terms of how much tidal flat occurs there.

Natural resources
Iron ore, coal, potash, timber, lignite, uranium, copper, petroleum, natural gas, salt, nickel, and water.

Environment

Current issues
Emissions from coal-burning utilities and industries contribute to air pollution; acid rain, resulting from sulphur dioxide emissions, is damaging forests in Germany; pollution in the Baltic Sea from raw sewage and industrial effluents from rivers in eastern Germany; hazardous waste disposal; government (under Chancellor Schröder, SPD) announced intent to end the use of nuclear power for producing electricity; government working to meet EU commitment to identify nature preservation areas in line with the EU's Flora, Fauna, and Habitat directive. Germany's last glacier is disappearing.

International agreements
 Party to: Air Pollution, Air Pollution-Nitrogen oxides, Air Pollution-Persistent Organic Pollutants, Air Pollution-Sulphur 85, Air Pollution-Sulphur 94, Air Pollution-Volatile Organic Compounds, Antarctic-Environmental Protocol, Antarctic Treaty, Biodiversity, Climate Change, Climate Change-Kyoto Protocol, Desertification, Endangered Species, Environmental Modification, Hazardous Wastes, Law of the Sea, Marine Dumping, Nuclear Test Ban, Ozone Layer Protection, Ship Pollution, Tropical Timber 83, Tropical Timber 94, Wetlands, Whaling
 Signed, but not ratified: none

Natural hazards
Flooding through rivers after heavy rainfall, such as during the 2002 European floods, or storm surge, such as the North Sea flood of 1962 and the historic floods of 1362 and 1634 that changed the coastline of what is now the west coast of Schleswig-Holstein.

Flora and fauna

Phytogeographically, Germany is shared between the Atlantic European and Central European provinces of the Circumboreal Region within the Boreal Kingdom. The territory of Germany can be subdivided into two ecoregions: European-Mediterranean montane mixed forests and Northeast-Atlantic shelf marine. The majority of Germany is covered by either arable land (33%) or forestry and woodland (31%). Only 15% is covered by permanent pastures.

The plants and animals of Germany are those generally common to central Europe. Beeches, oaks, and other deciduous trees constitute one-third of the forests; conifers are increasing as a result of reforestation. Spruce and fir trees predominate in the upper mountains, while pine and larch are found in sandy soil. There are many species of ferns, flowers, fungi, and mosses. Fish abound in the rivers and the North Sea. Wild animals include deer, wild boar, mouflon, fox, badger, hare, Eurasian lynx, and small numbers of beaver. Extinct/endangered animals include gray wolf, brown bear, and European bison. Various migratory birds cross Germany in the spring and autumn.

The national parks in Germany include the Wadden Sea National Parks, the Jasmund National Park, the Vorpommern Lagoon Area National Park, the Müritz National Park, the Lower Oder Valley National Park, the Harz National Park, the Saxon Switzerland National Park and the Bavarian Forest National Park.

Germany is known for its many zoological gardens, wildlife parks, aquaria, and bird parks. More than 400 registered zoos and animal parks operate in Germany, which is believed to be the largest number in any single country of the world. The Zoologischer Garten Berlin is the oldest zoo in Germany and presents the most comprehensive collection of species in the world.

Human geography

Demographics

With an estimated 83.2 million inhabitants in December 2020, Germany is the most populous country in the European Union and ranks as the 19th largest country in the world in terms of population.
The United Nations Population Fund lists Germany as host to the second-highest number of international migrants worldwide, around 23% of Germany's population do not hold a German passport or are direct descendants of immigrants. The number of third and subsequent generations of immigrants are not statistically recorded.

Administrative divisions
Germany comprises sixteen states that are collectively referred to as Länder. 
Each state has its own state constitution and is largely autonomous in regard to its internal organisation. Due to differences in size and population the subdivision of these states varies, especially between city states (Stadtstaaten) and states with larger territories (Flächenländer). For regional administrative purposes five states, namely Baden-Württemberg, Bavaria, Hesse, North Rhine-Westphalia and Saxony, consist of a total of 22 Government Districts (Regierungsbezirke). As of July 2021 Germany is divided into 400 districts (Kreise) on municipal level, these consist of 294 rural districts and 106 urban districts.

Urbanization

Germany has a number of large cities; the most populous are: Berlin, Hamburg, Munich, Cologne, Frankfurt, and Stuttgart. The largest conurbation is the Rhine-Ruhr region (12 million), including Düsseldorf (the capital of North Rhine-Westphalia), Cologne, Essen, Dortmund, Duisburg, and Bochum.

See also

Administrative divisions of Germany
Geography of Europe
Geology of Germany
List of islands of Germany
List of national parks of Germany
List of nature parks in Germany
Natural regions of Germany

Notes

References

External links

 Kostenlose Deutschland-Karten
 Geoberg.de: Geologie Deutschlands – Fotografien geologischer Objekte aus Deutschland
 mineralienatlas.de: Reiches Erz aus dem Harz
 Deutscher Klimaatlas
 Geography of Germany – Encyclopedia of World Geography